Saint-Julien-d'Intres is a commune in the Ardèche department in southern France. It is the result of the merger, on 1 January 2019, of the communes of Intres and Saint-Julien-Boutières.

Population

See also
Communes of the Ardèche department

References

Communes of Ardèche
Communes nouvelles of Ardèche
Populated places established in 2019
2019 establishments in France